Ganga Das (1823–1913) was a saint of the Udasi sect and known for piety and Hindi poetry. He was born in 1823 to a Jat family on the day of Basant Panchami at Rasulpur Bahlolpur village, Hapur district.

References 

1823 births
1913 deaths
Hindu activists
Indian Hindu monks
Indian male poets
19th-century Indian poets
Poets from Uttar Pradesh
19th-century Indian male writers